Zanget-e Sofla (also Romanized as Zanget-e Soflá; also known as Pā’īn Zanger, Pā’īn Zanget, and Zanget-e Pā’īn) is a village in Zarem Rud Rural District, Hezarjarib District, Neka County, Mazandaran Province, Iran. At the 2006 census, its population was 57, in 17 families.

References 

Populated places in Neka County